Ernest Amédée Barthélemy Mouchez (24 August 1821 – 29 June 1892) was a French naval officer who became director of the Paris Observatory and launched the ill-fated Carte du Ciel project in 1887.

Life
Born in Madrid, Spain, Mouchez embarked on a career in the French Navy as an ensign in 1843. This was a period of relative international maritime peace and much of the navy's activities were dedicated to exploration and discovery. Mouchez was initially occupied on hydrographic studies along the coasts of Korea, China and South America, penetrating 320 km up the Paraguay River and exploring the Abrolhos Islands. He improved the practice of surveying at sea, adapting terrestrial instruments for naval use, and was especially concerned with the problems of determining longitude. He developed the use of the theodolite and meridian telescope to improve the error in establishing longitude from around 30″ to 3–4″.

Attaining the rank of post captain in 1868, he embarked on a series of expeditions to chart the coast of Algeria. However, in 1870, during the Franco-Prussian War, he was called upon to make an heroic defence of the port of Le Havre.

Returning to his Algerian survey, he brought it to a conclusion in 1873, when he was elected to the Bureau des Longitudes and, in the following year, was sponsored by the Académie des sciences to observe the transit of Venus from St. Paul Island in the Indian Ocean. On 9 December he made a sequence of superb photographic plates of the event.

In 1875, the Académie elected him a member of the astronomy section and in 1878 he was promoted to rear admiral and awarded the role of director of the Paris Observatory. The observatory had fallen into disrepair and disrepute since the chaos of the 1870 war and the Paris Commune of 1871. Mouchez set about a programme of reconstruction but failed to persuade the government to fund a new observatory outside the centre of Paris.

In 1887, he collaborated with Sir David Gill to host an international astronomical conference in Paris. The principal outcome of the conference was a multi-national project to compile and index a photographic atlas of the heavens, the Carte du Ciel. The project consumed massive effort over several decades before it was rendered obsolete by modern astronomical methods.

Mouchez died in Wissous, Seine-et-Oise.

Honours
A statue in Le Havre was unveiled by Benjamin Baillaud in 1921.
A Street in Paris was given his name.

References

Works
Recherches sur la longitude de la côte orientale de l'Amérique du sud (1866)
 Rio de la Plata. Description et instructions nautiques (1873)
Instructions nautiques sur les côtes d'Algérie (1879)
Rapport annuel de l'Observatoire de Paris (1885–1892)
La photographie astronomique à l'Observatoire de Paris et de la Carte de ciel (1887)
Instructions nautiques sur les côtes du Brésil (1890)
Works digitalized on Paris Observatory digital library

Sources
[Anon.] (1875) Notice sur les travaux scientifiques de M. Mouchez, Paris
[Anon.] (1892) Polybiblion, 2nd ser. 36, July–December

[Anon.] (2001) "Carte du ciel", Encyclopædia Britannica, Deluxe CDROM edition

Simpkins, D. M. (1981) "Mouchez, Ernest Barthélémy", in 
Vapereau, G. (ed.) (1880) Dictionnaire universel des contemporains, 5th ed., Paris

Catalogues of Mouchez' works
Royal Society, Catalogue of Scientific Papers, IV 498, VIII 488, X 864;
Poggendorff, III 940, IV 1034-1035;
''Catalogue général des livres imprimés de la Bibliothèque nationale, CXX, cols.533–538.

External links
 

1821 births
1892 deaths
19th-century French astronomers
French Navy admirals
Members of the French Academy of Sciences
French scientific instrument makers
Scientists from Madrid
Recipients of the Lalande Prize